Martin Day was an Irish architect and builder active in early to mid-nineteenth-century County Wexford and County Waterford, in the southeast of Ireland. He was related to architects John Day and William Day, both of County Wexford, and connected with Richard Purcell. He was notable in designing several Church of Ireland churches for the Board of First Fruits and the Irish Ecclesiastical Commissioners between around 1822 and 1849. He assisted Daniel Robertson at Ballinkeele, Johnstown Castle, Bloomfield and Castleboro House in County Wexford. He designed without collaboration other country houses of less importance.

References

Irish ecclesiastical architects
Irish architects
People from County Wexford
Year of death missing
Year of birth missing